Special Support Unit is a special police unit in North Macedonia.

Notable domestic missions
2015 Kumanovo shootings

See also
Special Operations Unit - Tigers
Lions (police unit)
Alpha (Police Unit)
Border Police
Rapid Deployment Unit
Ministry of Internal Affairs
Police of North Macedonia
Lake Patrol

External links
 Patches of SSU

References

Specialist law enforcement agencies of North Macedonia